Melody and Moonlight is a 1940 American film starring Jane Frazee.

Plot

Kay Barnett is a free spirit, much like her aunt Adelaide, but such flamboyant behavior is disapproved of by Kay's father, Otis Barnett. He much prefers her to become a proper young lady and marry the dull but well-to-do Standish Prescott.

Kay and her aunt go to a dance hall, where Danny O'Brien mistakenly believes she is there for a dance contest. He pulls her into it and they take second prize. Danny also pays Kay's bill when she takes a room at a hotel where he works as a busboy, rescuing her when she has no money.

Danny and Kay decide to become a dance team but need a sponsor. They go to Aunt Adelaide's sweetheart, Abner Kelly, who agrees, but Otis Barnett gets wind of it, pressures Abner and scuttles the deal, frustrating Danny.

Ginger O'Brien, his little sister, befriends Kay and the family enjoys becoming acquainted with her, only to take umbrage when they discover Otis is her father and she's not who she seemed to be. Danny finds a new partner, but after Otis has a change of heart, Kay is rushed to the stage to become Danny's partner, then become his wife.

Cast

 Jane Frazee as Kay Barnett
 Johnny Downs as Danny O'Brien
 Vera Vague as Adelaide
 Jerry Colonna as Abner
 Mary Lee as Ginger
 Jonathan Hale as Otis

External links
 

1940 films
1940s English-language films
American black-and-white films
1940 musical films
Films produced by Robert North
American musical films
Films directed by Joseph Santley
Republic Pictures films
1940s American films